Malcolm Poole (born 6 November 1949) is a retired field hockey player from Australia, who was a member of the team that won the silver medal at the 1976 Summer Olympics in Montreal, Quebec,  Canada.

References

External links
 

1949 births
Living people
Australian male field hockey players
Olympic field hockey players of Australia
Field hockey players at the 1976 Summer Olympics
Olympic silver medalists for Australia
Place of birth missing (living people)
Olympic medalists in field hockey
Medalists at the 1976 Summer Olympics